The Panteón Civil de Dolores is the largest cemetery in Mexico and contains the "Rotonda de las Personas Ilustres". It is located on Constituyentes Avenue in the Miguel Hidalgo borough of Mexico City, between sections two and three of Chapultepec Park.

History
In 1875, the cemetery was opened and named El Panteon Civil de Dolores. Juan Manuel Benfield founded the Cemetery in honor of his sister who died in Veracruz shortly after she had arrived from London with their parents. As they were Anglicans, and all cemeteries in Veracruz were consecrated for use only by Roman Catholics, the only suitable burial ground to be had was on the beach. Today the cemetery has about 700,000 tombs, many with multiple occupants.

The Rotunda of Illustrious Persons

The Rotonda de las Personas Ilustres (Rotunda of Illustrious Persons) is a site that honors those who are considered to have exalted the civic, national and human values of Mexico. It contains the remains of those who have made important contributions in the military, civic and cultural fields. Originally named “The Rotunda of Illustrious Men” (Rotonda de los Hombres Ilustres), it was conceived by then President Sebastián Lerdo de Tejada as a space to perpetuate the memory of chosen men. The decree reads “In this place of honor, the necessary land will be given free of charge to erect the monuments designed to guard the remains of or perpetuate the memory of the illustrious men who are decreed or for whom posthumous honors are decreed.”  In 1876, The first person to be honored with a burial there was a soldier by the name of Pedro Litechipia, who died fighting against the empire of Maximilian. By decree of President Vicente Fox in 2003, the name was changed to Rotonda de las Personas Ilustres (Rotunda of Distinguished Persons, rather than Men) as the Rotunda has a number of female occupants. The Rotunda contains the graves of three former presidents, many heroes from the Mexican Revolution, writers, artists and scientists. The National General Archive shows 104 images of those buried there.

Problems

Generally considered the largest cemetery in Latin America, the most serious problem at the cemetery is limited space. No new grave sites have been established since 1975, and only people who bought a site in perpetuity prior to 1977 can bury members in the cemetery, but the remains must be stacked above those who are already interred. Municipal laws only permit five bodies to be buried in the same plot, but some tombs may have as many as ten buried one atop another.

The cemetery is working to encourage the acceptance of cremation as an alternative, and the crowded conditions, along with the desire to be interred there, has created demand for exhumation and cremation services. The cemetery has four crematoria averaging about four cremations daily. However, about ten traditional burials a day are still performed there, all in graves that had been used previously.

The cemetery is listed with National Institute of Anthropology and History as a historical monument due to the persons interred and age of the cemetery. However, this has not kept the cemetery in good repair. There are problems with maintenance and security. In the back part of the cemetery in a gully, workers have discarded old caskets and urns that are considered unusable. Those who work in the cemetery testify to graverobbing here for artistic and archeological pieces.  In January 2009, a section of the original retaining wall built in the 19th century on the south side fell. This section was over 1 km long and 4 meters high, damaging a number of graves. Rehabilitation work was scheduled for September 2008 at a cost of 10 million pesos with a focus of making the cemetery more dignified for visitors, including the remodeling of the main entrance on Constituyentes Avenue.

Notable people interred at the Panteón Dolores
The following is the list of people currently interred at the Rotunda of Illustrious Persons:

See also
 
 
 Rotonda de Hombres Ilustres — similar style monument in city of Chihuahua, México''.

References

External links
 

Cemeteries in Mexico City
Chapultepec
1875 establishments in Mexico
Tourist attractions in Mexico City